William Leech may refer to:

 Billy Leech (William Leech, 1875–1934), English footballer
 William John Leech (1881–1968), Irish painter
 William Leech PLC, a Tyneside housebuilder

Leech, William